Barclay is a neighborhood in the center of Baltimore City. Its boundaries, as defined by the City Planning Office, are marked by North Avenue, Greenmount Avenue, Saint Paul and 25th Streets. The neighborhood lies north of Greenmount West, south of Charles Village, west of East Baltimore Midway, and east of Charles North and Old Goucher. The boundary between the Northern and Eastern police districts runs through the community, cutting it roughly in half.

History 
Although the neighborhood's history reaches into the eighteenth century, most of the current historic buildings date between 1870 and 1917. During this period, the neighborhood matured into an urban, elegant rowhouse neighborhood. Influencing the architectural design of the neighborhood was the building of Lovely Lane Methodist Church and Old Goucher College. In 1883, Stanford White designed Lovely Lane Methodist Church. Between 1885 and 1897 Goucher College, then known as Baltimore's Women College, had built twenty-two buildings. By 1910 Barclay and the surrounding neighborhoods were completely developed, and these buildings weave together a design sensibility still felt throughout the neighborhood.

The neighborhood thrived until the Great Depression. In the early 1940s the neighborhood began to accommodate a large influx of war-time workers, and many of the houses were divided into apartments. Goucher College moved its campus to Towson in 1952; the suburban rush was on. After the 1968 riots, many businesses and homeowners moved to the suburbs. Consequently, the neighborhood began to become less desirable. During the mid-1990s, some demolition occurred within the area. Today, however, there is a revival of urban living that has captured the attention of Baltimore.

Neighborhood & Community Organizations 
Barclay has benefitted from the work of several neighborhood-focused organizations that engage in community building and planning. Some of the active organizations are listed below:
 Barclay-Midway & Old Goucher Coalition
 Greater Greenmount Community Association
 People's Homesteading Group
 Station North Arts and Entertainment District

Education 
There are a number of schools accessible to residents of the Barclay community including:
 Baltimore Lab School
 Gateway School
 Dallas F. Nichols Sr. Elementary School
 Mother Seton Academy
 Cecil Elementary School
 Margaret Brent Elementary
 Barclay Elementary/Middle School
 Baltimore Montessori Public Charter School

Barclay Today 
The community boasts Victorian-era townhomes, tree-lined streets and beautiful architectural details. Though the area's houses were clearly built for the middle-class, the neighborhood went through a period of economic decline, housing abandonment, crime and gang problems. The neighborhood has seen significant investment and development since 2005, when well-organized residents created a community development vision plan that has served as a catalyst for Barclay's resurgence.  Telesis Corporation was selected by the Housing Authority of Baltimore City (“HABC”) and the Barclay/ Midway/ Old Goucher (“BMOG”) community to serve as the developer for a large-scale, multi-phased $85 million revitalization effort in the BMOG neighborhood.

To improve the housing stock and combat blight, a participatory planning process involving key community stakeholders led to the creation of the Barclay/ Midway/ Old Goucher Redevelopment Plan.  The redevelopment strategy focuses on mending the fabric of the neighborhood through the scattered-site infill development of 268 scattered-site parcels, including 94 vacant lots, into approximately 320 units of mixed-income and mixed-tenure housing, with both rental and homeownership opportunities. A central component to this neighborhood revitalization effort includes strengthening the socio-economic base of the community, while encouraging sustainable building practices. In 2006, a green design charrette held by community residents and developers resulted in the creation of the BMOG Green Building Guidelines, which incorporate LEED, USGBC and Enterprise Green building principles. As a result, many of the recently developed townhouses and apartment buildings have achieved certification for sustainable development.   Barclay is also one of the focus neighborhoods in Central Baltimore Partnership's Explore the Core campaign.

See also 
 List of Baltimore neighborhoods

References

External links 
Description of the Barclay/Midway/Old Goucher Project
North District Maps, Baltimore City Neighborhoods Portal
Barclay transforming from 'gritty Greenmount' to trendy new haven
$18 million deal approved for Barclay revitalization
New homes rise in Greater Greenmount
Barclay community celebrates phase 1 of major $85 million housing makeover
Barclay redevelopment groundbreaking
Baltimore's core neighborhoods quietly transformed
$85 million housing project moves forward
Officials announce $10 million fund for projects in central Baltimore
How Barclay offers a road map for improvement in Sandtown
Music shop owner aims to spur interest along north Charles Street 

 
Neighborhoods in Baltimore